Adisa Alao Fatai (born 30 November 1986 in Kwara) is a Nigerian footballer.

Career

Al-Oruba
Adisa joined Oruba in 2009 from Al-Ittihad (Ibb). He played in 2012 for the club Al-Oruba in the 2012 AFC Cup.

Mohun Bagan
On 26 June 2014 it was announced that Fatai had signed for Indian club, Mohun Bagan, of the I-League. However, on 5 November 2014, he was released by mutual agreement for failing to "adjust to the Indian conditions and style of play".

However, on 5 November 2014, before the season began, Adisa was released from Mohun Bagan.

Career statistics

Club
Statistics accurate as of 14 May 2012

References

1986 births
Living people
Yoruba sportspeople
Nigerian footballers
Expatriate footballers in Yemen
Kwara United F.C. players
Mohun Bagan AC players
Nigerian expatriate sportspeople in Yemen
Association football defenders
People from Kwara State